Kirkby International College (KIC) is a further education college based at Pesiaran APEC, Cyberjaya, Selangor, Malaysia. The institution was officially launched by the Malaysian Deputy Prime Minister Tan Sri Muhyiddin Yassin in January 2014.

History
The college was originally established in 2007 under the name Internexia College, to reflect a close affiliation with its digital content creation partner, Internexia Sdn Bhd. However, and probably as a result of its focus on teacher training and English learning courses, the college was suggested by some to be a contemporary return of the Malayan Teachers Training College in Kirkby, Liverpool, England, which closed down in 1962 and which is credited with having produced highly capable Malaysian teachers in its day. In 2011 Internexia College subsequently changed its name to Kirkby International College to better reflect its role as an English learning institution for Malaysian teachers.

Kirkby International College specializes in the provision of diploma level programs in English, creative media, ICT Education, training materials for serving teachers to update their professional skills, associated management, and interactive multimedia-based education and skills training to meet local as well as international demand.

Kirby International College offers local and international programs including, Cambridge A-Levels, Diplomas (early childhood education and English), Foundation Courses (University of Hertfordshire) and pathways to Degrees. This college had permanently closed early 2017.

Location
Kirkby International College is a purpose built facility located at Pesiaran APEC, Cyberjaya.

Courses offered
Kirkby International College offers a range of courses from foundation to masters level.  Currently on offer are:-

Diploma in Early Childhood Education
Diploma in English
Diploma in Animation
Cambridge International AS and A Levels
International Foundation Programme in partnership with University of Hertfordshire (UK)
BEd (Hons) Primary Education With English in partnership with University of Hertfordshire (UK)
Short Courses in English, ICT, Soft Skills and Study Skills

Partnerships
University of Hertfordshire (UK)
University Pendidikan Sultan Idris
Glyndwr University (UK)
The Open Polytechnic of New Zealand

References

External links
 University of Hertfordshire
Afterschool
 Kirkby International College homepage
 New Straits Times
The Star
MBA in Malaysia

Colleges in Malaysia
MSC Malaysia
Sepang District
Universities and colleges in Selangor
2014 establishments in Malaysia
Educational institutions established in 2014
Cambridge schools in Malaysia